3240 or variant, may refer to:

In general
 A.D. 3240, a year in the 4th millennium CE
 3240 BC, a year in the 4th millennium BCE
 3240, a number in the 3000 (number) range

Other uses
 3240 Laocoon, a trojan asteroid of the Jupiter trojan camp region, the 3240th asteroid registered
 Kentucky Route 3240, a state highway
 Texas Farm to Market Road 3240, a state highway

See also